Bundle of Joy is an album recorded in 1977 by jazz trumpeter Freddie Hubbard. It was released on the Columbia label and features performances by Hubbard, Dorothy Ashby, Azar Lawrence and Ernie Watts.

Reception
A reviewer of Dusty Groove commented "A bundle of soul from Freddie Hubbard – one that has him blowing beautifully over full arrangements from Bert DeCoteux – the 70s super-soul maestro who really brings a new sound to Hubbard's music! The style's a bit smoother than other Freddie albums of the time, but still really great – a wonderful plenty of his well-timed, well-punctuated work on trumpet with warm grooves supplied by Bert – filled with instrumentation that includes David T Walker on guitar, Ernie Watts on sax and flute, Azar Lawrence on tenor, David Garfield on keyboards, and even Dorothy Ashby on flute".

Track listing
All compositions by Freddie Hubbard except as indicated
 "Bundle of Joy"
 "Rainy Day Song"
 "Portrait of Jennie" (Gordon Burdge, J. Russel Robinson)
 "From Now On"
 "Tucson Stomp"
 "Rahsann"
 "I Don't Want to Lose You" (Thom Bell, Linda Creed)
 "From Behind"

Personnel
Freddie Hubbard: trumpet
Bobby Bryant: trumpet
Snooky Young: trumpet
Nolan Smith: trumpet
George Bohanon: trombone
Garnett Brown: trombone
Ernie Watts: tenor saxophone, alto saxophone
Azar Lawrence: tenor saxophone
David Garfield: keyboards, celeste
Michael Stanton: keyboards
Dorothy Ashby: harp
Bill Green: tenor saxophone
David Sherr: oboe
Ernie Fields: baritone saxophone
David T. Walker: guitar
Craig McMullen: guitar
Jay Graydon: guitar
Rick Littlefield: guitar
Henry Davis: bass
Curtis Robertson Jr.: bass
Eric Ward: bass
Carlos Vega: drums
Ed Greene: drums
Freddy Alexander: drums
Tommy Vig: percussion
Bob Zimmitti: percussion
Paulinho da Costa: conga
Dee Ervin, Maxine Willard Waters, Venetta Fields, Julia Tillman-Waters, Pat Henderson: vocals

References

Freddie Hubbard albums
1977 albums
Columbia Records albums